This is a list of seasons completed by the Texas Longhorns men's college basketball team.

Seasons
Final AP Poll (1949–present)Final Coaches' Poll (1951–present)

References

 
Texas Longhorns
Texas Longhorns basketball seasons